Philipp Friedrich Buchner (11 September 1614, in Wertheim – 23 March 1669, in Würzburg) was a German composer. He converted to Catholicism in Poland, and travelled to Italy to absorb the new style of Monteverdi. On his return to Germany he was employed by bishop Johann Philipp von Schönborn in Mainz for his Electoral orchestra.

Works, editions, recordings
His works available in modern edition include a Christmas cantata. Selections from his collection Plectrum Musicum were recorded by the ensemble Parnassi Musici and the Bavarian Chamber Orchestra for CPO in 2005.

References

1614 births
1669 deaths
17th-century classical composers
German Baroque composers
German classical composers
German male classical composers
17th-century male musicians